The Journal of Cosmology and Astroparticle Physics is an online-only peer-reviewed scientific journal focusing on all aspects of cosmology and astroparticle physics. This encompasses theory, observation, experiment, computation and simulation. It has been published jointly by IOP Publishing and the International School for Advanced Studies since 2003. Journal of Cosmology and Astroparticle Physics has been a part of the SCOAP3 initiative. But from 1 January 2017, it has moved out from SCOAP3 agreement.

Abstracting and indexing 
Journal of Cosmology and Astroparticle Physics is indexed and abstracted in the following databases:

References

External links 
 

Astrophysics journals
IOP Publishing academic journals
Publications established in 2003
English-language journals
Monthly journals
Online-only journals
Academic journals published by independent research institutes